Devil's Hands is an album by Japanese singer-songwriter Aco, released on 6 October 2010. It was Aco's eighth studio album.

Track listing 
 Devil's Hands
 Mirror
 
 Ahaha!!!
 
 
 My Dearest Friend

References 

https://web.archive.org/web/20120229224244/http://acoaco.com/music.html#album8

Aco (musician) albums